Jürgen Henn (born 2 June 1987) is an Estonian football manager who is the current head coach of Meistriliiga club Flora.

Managerial career
On 5 January 2018, Henn was appointed as the manager of Flora, having previously coached the club's reserve teams. He won the Meistriliiga in 2019 and 2020.

On 26 August 2021, Flora became the first Estonian club to advance to a UEFA tournament after beating Shamrock Rovers 5–2 on aggregate to qualify for the 2021–22 UEFA Europa Conference League.

Honours

Managerial
Flora
 Meistriliiga: 2019, 2020, 2022
 Estonian Cup: 2019–20
 Estonian Supercup: 2020, 2021

References

External links

1987 births
Living people
Sportspeople from Viljandi
Estonian footballers
Esiliiga players
FC Elva players
Meistriliiga players
Viljandi JK Tulevik players
FC Flora players
FC Flora managers
Association football midfielders
Estonian football managers